Larry Delray Stordahl (born October 23, 1942) is an American former ice hockey defenseman and Olympian.

Stordahl played with Team USA at the 1968 Winter Olympics held in Grenoble, France. He previously played for the Rochester Mustangs of the United States Hockey League.

References

External links

1942 births
Living people
Ice hockey players at the 1968 Winter Olympics
Olympic ice hockey players of the United States
American men's ice hockey left wingers